Mappila Muslim, often shortened to Mappila, formerly anglicized as Moplah/Mopla and historically known as Jonaka/Chonaka Mappila or Moors Mopulars/Mouros da Terra and Mouros Malabares, in general, is a member of the Muslim community of same name found predominantly in Kerala and Lakshadweep Islands, in southern India. Muslims of Kerala make up 26.56% of the population of the state (2011), and as a religious group they are the second largest group after Hindus (54.73%). Mappilas share the common language of Malayalam with the other religious communities of Kerala.

According to some scholars, the Mappilas are the oldest settled native Muslim community in South Asia. In general, a Mappila is either a descendant of any native convert to Islam or a mixed descendant of any Middle Eastern — Arab or Persian — individual. Mappilas are but one among the many communities that form the Muslim population of Kerala. No Census Report where the Muslim communities were mentioned separately is also available.

The Mappila community originated primarily as a result of the West Asian contacts with Kerala, which was fundamentally based upon commerce ("the spice trade"). As per local tradition, Islam reached Malabar Coast, of which the Kerala state is a part of, as early as the 7th century AD. Before being overtaken by the Europeans in the spice trade, Mappilas were a prosperous trading community, settled mainly in the coastal urban centres of Kerala. The continuous interaction of the Mappilas with the Middle East has created a profound impact on their life, customs, and culture. This has resulted in the formation of a unique Indo-Islamic synthesis — within the large spectrum of Kerala culture — in literature, art, food, language, and music.

Most of the Muslims in Kerala follow the Shāfiʿī School, while a large minority follow movements such as Salafism. Contrary to a popular misconception, the caste system, like from other parts of South Asia, does exist among the Muslims of Kerala (although all Muslims are allowed to worship in all Kerala mosques, certain communities are held in "lower status" to others). A number of different communities, some of them having distant ethnic roots, exist as status groups in Kerala.

Etymology

Mappila Muslims are but one among the many communities that form the Muslim population of Kerala. Sometimes the whole Muslim community in Kerala, is known by the term "Mappila". Portuguese writer Duarte Barbosa (1515) uses the term 'Moors Mopulars' for the Muslims of Kerala.

"Mappila" (originally meaning "the great child" and now often used as a synonym for son-in-law/bridegroom) was a respectful, and honorific title given to foreign visitors, merchants and immigrants to Malabar Coast by the native Hindus. The Muslims were referred to as Jonaka or Chonaka Mappila ("Yavanaka Mappila"), to distinguish them from the Nasrani Mappila (Saint Thomas Christians) and the Juda Mappila (Cochin Jews).

Demographics and distribution

Demographics 
According to the 2011 census, about one-quarter of Kerala's population (26.56%) are Muslims. The calculated Muslim population (2011) in Kerala state is 88,73,472. The number of Muslims in rural areas is only 42,51,787, against an urban population of 46,21,685.

Distribution 
The number of Muslims is particularly high in the northern Kerala (former Malabar District). Mappilas are also found in Lakshadweep islands in the Arabian Sea. A small number of Malayali Muslims have settled in the southern districts of Karnataka and western parts of Tamil Nadu, while the scattered presence of the community in major cities of India can also be seen. When the British supremacy on Malabar District was established, many Mappilas were recruited for employment in plantations in Burma, Assam and for manual labor in South East Asian concerns of the British Empire. Diaspora groups of Mappilas are also found in Singapore and Malaysia. Furthermore, a substantial proportion of Muslims have left Kerala to seek employment in the Middle East, especially in Saudi Arabia and United Arab Emirates.

According to the 2011 Census of India, the district-wise distribution of the Muslim population is as shown below:

Portuguese distinctions 
The Muslims present in Kerala were distinguished by the Portuguese historians into two groups:
 Mouros da Terra ("Moors of the Land").
 Mouros da Arabia/Mouros de Meca ("Moors from Arabia/Mecca").
The latter, also known as the "Paradesi Muslims", in fact came from all over the Islamic world. They included Arabs, Persians, Egyptians, Turks, Iraqis, Gujaratis, Khorasanis and Deccanis (and Melakans, Sumatrans, Bengalis). These Muslims were not unsettled navigators but had settled in Kerala. The Malayali (and Tamil Muslim) community as a whole was considerably lower economic standing than the Paradesi Muslims.

A Mappila is either,

 A descendant of any native convert (vast majority were Ezhavar, Thiyyar, Pulayar and Mukkuvar)) to Islam (or) 
 A descendant of a marriage alliance between a Middle Eastern individual and a native low caste woman

Till the 16th century, as noticed by the contemporary observers, Muslims settled mainly along the coastal tracts of Kerala (especially in major Kerala ports such as Calicut (Kozhikode), Cannanore (Kannur), Tanore (Tanur), Funan (Ponnani), Cochin (Kochi) and Quilon (Kollam)). They were traditionally elite merchants who were all part of the brisk foreign trade. Until well into the European period, the Muslims were almost exclusively concentrated in the port cities. Middle Eastern sailors had to rely on lighterage at most of the Kerala ports in the medieval period. This led them to enter into mutually beneficial relationships with the traditional sea fishermen community. A large majority of fishermen, once low-caste Hindus, in northern Kerala now follow Islam.

Inland Growth 
After and during the Portuguese period, some of the Muslim merchants were forced to turn inland (Malabar) in search of alternative occupations to commerce. Some acquired land and became landowners and some became agricultural labourers. Between 16th and 20th centuries, the collective Mappila numbers increased rapidly in Malabar District, chiefly by the conversion among the lower and 'outcaste' Hindu groups of the South Malabar interior. The peak of the Muslim distribution in Kerala had gradually shifted to the interior Malabar District. William Logan, comparing the Census Reports of 1871 and 1881, famously concluded that within ten years some 50,000 people from the Cheruma community (former untouchables) converted to Islam. Muslim growth in the 20th century has considerably outpaced that of the general Kerala population due to higher birth rates.

British distinctions 
During the British period the so-called Mappila Outbreaks, c. 1836–1921 led the officials to make and maintain a distinction between the interior Mappilas and the 'respectable' Mappila traders of the coastal cities, such as Calicut. The two other regional groupings are the high-status Muslim families of Cannanore in North Malabar — arguably converts from high caste Hindus — and the Muslims of Travancore and Cochin. The Colonial administrates also kept a distinction between coastal and inland Mappilas of the South Malabar.

 Thangals (the Sayyids) – at the top were the aristrocratic Tangals (the Sayyids), who claim descent from the family of Prophet Muhammed.
 Arabis - Below the Thangals are Arabis (mostly from the coastal towns), the people tracing their origin from the West Asian intermarriage with Malayali women.
 Landed Aristocracy - the Arabis were followed by the landed aristocracy, centred on Cannanore, North Malabar, arguably converts from high caste Hindus.
 Lastly, there were the converts from the Backward and Scheduled Hindu castes (such as the South Malabar interior Mappilas, Pusalars/Puyislans and the Ossans).

History

Arrival of Islam in Kerala and Lakshadweep

Kerala has been a major spice exporter since 3000 BCE, according to Sumerian records and it is still referred to as the "Garden of Spices" or as the "Spice Garden of India". Kerala's spices attracted ancient Arabs, Babylonians, Assyrians and Egyptians to the Malabar Coast in the 3rd and 2nd millennia BCE. Phoenicians established trade with Kerala during this period. Arabs and Phoenicians were the first to enter Malabar Coast to trade Spices. The Arabs on the coasts of Yemen, Oman, and the Persian Gulf, must have made the first long voyage to Kerala and other eastern countries. They must have brought the Cinnamon of Kerala to the Middle East. The Greek historian Herodotus (5th century BCE) records that in his time the cinnamon spice industry was monopolized by the Egyptians and the Phoenicians.

Islam arrived in Malabar Coast, a part of the larger Indian Ocean rim, via spice and silk traders from the Middle East. It is generally agreed among scholars that Middle Eastern merchants frequented the Malabar Coast, which was the link between the West and ports of East Asia, even before Islam had been established in Arabia. The western coast of India was the chief centre of Middle Eastern trading activities right from at least 4th century AD and by about 7th century AD, and several West Asian merchants had taken permanent residence in some port cities of the Malabar Coast. According to popular tradition, Islam was brought to Lakshadweep, situated just to the west of Malabar Coast, by Ubaidullah in 661 CE. His grave is believed to be located on the island of Andrott. A number of foreign accounts have mentioned about the presence of considerable Muslim population in the coastal towns of Kerala. Arab writers such as Masudi of Baghdad (934–955 AD), Idrisi (1154 AD), Abul-Fida (1213 AD) and al-Dimishqi (1325 AD) mentions the Muslim communities in Kerala. Some historians assume that the Mappilas can be considered as the first native, settled Islamic community in South Asia.

The Southwestern Coast of India was known as "Malabar" (a mixture of Tamil Malai and Arabic or Persian Barr, most probably) to the West Asians. Persian scholar al-Biruni (973–1052 AD) appears to have been the first to call the region by this name. Masudi of Baghdad (896–965 AD) speaks about the contacts between Malabar and Arabia. Authors such as Ibn Khurdad Beh (869 – 885 AD), Ahmad al Baladhuri (892 AD), and Abu Zayd of Ziraf (916 AD) mentions Malabar ports in their works. Scholar C. N. Ahammad Moulavi has mentioned that he has seen at Irikkalur near Valapattanam a tombstone bearing the date 670 AD/Hijra 50 (it seems that the tombstone is now lost). Inscriptions found on a tombstone on the beach outside the Juma'h Mosque in Panthalayani Kollam record the death of one Abu ibn Udthorman in Hijra 166. The mosque itself contains two medieval royal charters, one on a block of granite built into the steps of the mosque tank and another one a loose stone lying outside, of the Kodungallur Chera king Bhaskara Ravi Manukuladitya (962–1021 AD). The position of the royal Chera charter (in Old Malayalam) inside the mosque suggests that the city belonged to the Muslims or included them or came into their possession at a later stage. A few Umayyad (661–750 AD) coins were discovered from Kothamangalam in the eastern part of Ernakulam district.

The earliest major epigraphic evidence of Muslim merchants in Kerala is a royal charter by Ayyan Atikal, the powerful governor of Kollam under the Chera king of Kodungallur. The Quilon Syrian Copper Plate (c. 883 AD, "the Tabula Quilonensis") is written in Old Malayalam in Vatteluttu script, and concludes with a number of "signatures" in Kufic Arabic, Middle Persian in Pahlavi script and Judaeo-Persian. The charter shows Atikal, in presence of the royal representative from Kodungallur (prince Kota Ravi Vijayaraga) and regional civil and military officials, granting land and serfs to the Tarisapalli, built by Mar Sapir Iso, and conferring privileges on Anchuvannam and Manigramam. The attestation to the copper plates in the Kufic script reads: "[And witness] to this Maymun ibn Ibrahim, Muhammad ibn Manih, Sulh [?Salih] ibn 'Ali, 'Uthaman ibn al-Marzuban, Muhammad ibn Yahya, 'Amr ibn Ibrahim, Ibrahim ibn al-Tayy, Bakr ibn Mansur, al-Qasim ibn Hamid, Mansur ibn 'Isa and, Isma'il ibn Ya'qub". The presence of non-Christian signatures and the names found in the charter prove that the associates of Mar Sapir Iso included Jews and Muslims too. Muslim Arabs and some Persians must have formed permanent settlements at Kollam by this period. The charter gives proof of the status and privileges of trading guilds in Kerala. "Anjuvannam", mentioned in the copper plate, was a merchant association composed Christians, Jews and Muslims.

In keeping with Kodungallur's significant role in the spice trade, the legends of Kerala Christians, Jews and Muslims all depict this port city as the focal point for the spread of their respective faiths. According to the legend of Cheraman Perumal, or as per one version of it, the first Indian mosque was built in 624 AD at Kodungallur with the mandate of the last the ruler (the Cheraman Perumal) of Chera dynasty, who converted to Islam during the lifetime of Prophet Muhammad (c. 570–632). Perumal's proselytisers, led by Malik ibn Dinar, established a series of mosques in his kingdom and north of it, thus facilitating the expansion of Islam in Kerala. It is assumed that the first recorded version of this legend is an Arabic manuscript of anonymous authorship known as "Qissat Shakarwati Farmad". While there is no concrete historical evidence for this tradition, there can be little doubt of the early Muslim presence, and of the religious tolerance based on economic imperatives, on the Malabar Coast. The account of conversion of Islam by the then Cheraman Perumal is generally considered apocryphal by mainstream scholars.

First mosques of Malabar according to the Qissat Shakarwati Farmad

According to the Qissat, the first mosque was built by Malik ibn Dinar in Kodungallur, while the rest of the mosques were founded by Malik ibn Habib.

It is believed that Malik Dinar died at Thalangara in Kasaragod town. The Koyilandy Jumu'ah Mosque contains an Old Malayalam inscription written in a mixture of Vatteluttu and Grantha scripts which dates back to the 10th century CE. It is a rare surviving document recording patronage by a Hindu king (Bhaskara Ravi) to the Muslims of Kerala. The Arabic inscription on a copper slab within the Madayi Mosque records its foundation year as Hijra 518 (1124 AD). The mosque in the heart of the old Chera capital, the Kodungallur Mosque, has a granite foundation exhibiting 11th–12th century architectural style.

Growth of Islam in Kerala 
The Middle Eastern Muslim traders and Kerala mercantile community went through a long period of peaceful intercultural growth till the arrival of the Portuguese explorers (early 16th century). Quilon (Kollam) in south Kerala was the southernmost of the Kerala ports associated with black pepper. It served as the region's gateway to the eastern Indian Ocean. East and Southeast Asia were the primary markets for Kerala's main export, the spices, until at least the c. 15th century. In 1403, it seems that, the Ming court first learned of the existence of Malacca from one pepper merchant, a Muslim believed to have come from the Malabar Coast.

Moroccan traveller Ibn Battutah (14th century) has recorded the considerably huge presence of Muslim merchants and settlements of sojourning traders in most of the ports of Kerala. Immigration, intermarriage and missionary activity/conversion — secured by the common interest in the spice trade — helped in this development. The monopoly of overseas spice trade in the Arabian Sea was safe with the Arab and Persian shipping magnates from the Malabar Coast. Fortunes of these merchants depended on the political patronage of the native chiefs of Calicut (Kozhikode), Cannanore (Kannur), Cochin (Kochi), and Quilon (Kollam). The chiefs of these tiny kingdoms derived a great part of their revenue from taxing the spice trade. A 13th century granite inscription, in Old Malayalam and Arabic, at Muchundi Mosque in Calicut mentions a donation by the king to the mosque. The inscription is the only surviving historical document recording royal endowment by a Hindu ruler, in the form of a grant, to the Muslim community in Kerala.

By the early decades of the 14th century, travellers speak of Calicut (Kozhikode) as the major port city in Kerala. Some of the important administrative positions in the kingdom of Calicut, such as that of the port commissioner, were held by Muslims. The port commissioner, the "shah bandar", represented commercial interests of the Muslim merchants. In his account, Ibn Batttutah mentions Shah Bandars in Calicut and Quilon (Ibrahim Shah Bandar and Muhammed Shah Bandar). The "nakhudas", merchant magnates owning ships, spread their shipping and trading business interests across the Indian Ocean. The famous nakhuda Mishkal who possessed ships for the trade with China, Yemen and Persia was active in Calicut in the 1340s. But unlike in some of the other regions of the Indian Ocean, in Kerala, it seems that the nakhudas did not held any positions of commercial, communal leadership. The Muslim line of Ali Rajas of Arakkal, near Cannanore, who were the vassals of the Kolathiri, ruled over the Lakshadweep. Zayn al-Din Makhdum (c. 1498–1581) estimates that 10% of the population of Malabar was Muslim by the midpoint of the 16th century AD. Samarqandi said that in Calicut he met Muslims among the "horde of infidels", and that both kings and beggars wear the same thing but that the Muslims wear fine clothing in the Arab fashion.

The Middle Eastern Muslims controlled the lucrative western arm of the overseas long-distance trade (to the ports of the Red Sea, and the Persian Gulf) from the Malabar Coast. Export items across the Arabian Sea included spices such as pepper, ginger and cardamom, trans-shipped textiles, coconuts and associated products. Gold, copper, and silver, horses, silk and various aromatics were imported into Kerala. The native Muslims dominated the trade to Pegu, Mergui, Melaka (in Myanmar and Malaysia) and points east, and the Indian coastal trade (Canara, Malabar, Ceylon, Maldives and Coromandel Coast, and other Bay of Bengal shores) with the Chettis from Coromandel Coast. Muslims, with Gujarati Vanias, also took part in the trade with ports of Gujarat. The Indian coastal trade included goods such as coconuts, coir, pepper, cardamom, cinnamon and rice. Rice was a major import item into Kerala, from the Canara and the Coromandel Coast. Low-value but high-volume trade in foodstuffs that passed through the Gulf of Mannar was also handled by the native Muslims.

The European period 

In the past, there were many Muslim traders in the ports of Malabar. Following the discovery of a direct sea route from Europe to Kozhikode in 1498, the Portuguese began to expand their territories and ruled the seas between Ormus and the Malabar Coast and south to Ceylon. In the first two decades of 16th century CE (c. 1500–1520), Portuguese traders were successful in reaching in agreements with the local Hindu chiefs and native Muslim (Mappila) merchants in Kerala. The major contradiction was between the Portuguese state and the Arab and Persian traders, and the Kingdom of Calicut. In January 1502, the First Battle of Cannanore between the Third Portuguese Armada and Kingdom of Cochin under João da Nova and Zamorin of Kozhikode's navy marked the beginning of Portuguese conflicts in the Indian Ocean. The big Mappila traders in Cochin supplied large quantities of Southeast Asian spices to the Portuguese carracks. These traders, along with the Syrian Christians, acted as brokers and intermediaries in the purchase of spices and in the sale of the goods brought from Europe.
Wealthy Muslim merchants of the Malabar Coast – including Mappilas – provided large credits to the Portuguese. These businessmen received large trading concessions, stipends and privileges in return. Interaction between the Portuguese private traders and Mappila merchants also continued to be tolerated by the Portuguese state. Kingdom of Calicut, whose shipping was increasingly looted by the Portuguese, evolved into a centre of Muslim resistance. In February 1509, the defeat of the joint fleet of the Sultan of Gujarat, the Mamlûk Burji Sultanate of Egypt, and the Zamorin of Calicut with support of the Republic of Venice and the Ottoman Empire in Battle of Diu marked the beginning of Portuguese dominance of the Spice trade and the Indian Ocean.

Sooner rather than later, tensions arose between the wealthy Mappila traders of Cannanore and the Portuguese state. The ships of the Cannanore Mappilas again and again fell prey to the Portuguese sailors off the coast of Maldives, an important point between Southeast Asia and the Red Sea. Interests of the Portuguese casado moradores in Cochin, now planning to capture the spice trade through the Gulf of Mannar and to Sri Lanka, came into the conflict with Mappilas and the (Tamil) Maraikkayars. The narrow gulf held the key to the trade to Bengal (especially Chittagong). By the 1520s, open confrontations between the Portuguese and the Mappilas, from Ramanathapuram, and Thoothukudi to northern Kerala, and to western Sri Lanka, became a common occurrence. The Mappila traders actively worked in even in the island of Sri Lanka to oppose the Portuguese. The Portuguese maintained patrolling squadrons off the Kerala ports and continued their raids on departing Muslim fleets at Calicut and Quilon. After a series of naval battles, the once powerful Mappila chief was finally forced to sue for peace with the Portuguese in 1540. The peace was soon broken, with the assassination of the qazi of Cannanore Abu Bakr Ali (1545), and the Portuguese again came down hard on the Mappilas. In the meantime, the Portuguese also entered into friendship with some of the leading Middle Eastern merchants residing on the Malabar Coast (1550). The mantle of the Muslim resistance was now taken by the Ali Rajas of Cannanore, who even forced the king of Calicut to turn against the Portuguese once again. By the close of the 16th century, the Ali Rajas had emerged as figures with as much influence in Kerala as the Kolathiri (Chirakkal Raja) himself. Before the 16th century, Middle Eastern Muslims dominated the economic, social and religious affairs of Kerala Muslims. Many of these merchants fled Kerala in the course of the 16th century. The vacuum created economic opportunities for some Mappila traders, who also took on a greater role in the social and religious affairs in Malabar. The Portuguese tried to establish a monopoly in the spice trade in India, using violent naval warfare. Whenever a formal war was broke out between the Portuguese and the Calicut rulers, the Portuguese attacked and plundered, as the opportunity offered, the Muslim ports in Kerala. Small, lightly armed, and highly mobile vessels of the Mappilas remained a major threat to Portuguese shipping all along the west coast of India. Mappila merchants, now controlling pepper trade in Calicut in the place of the West Asian Muslims, drew Mappila corsairs and used them to transport the spices past Portuguese blockades. Some Mappila traders even tried to outwit the Portuguese by reorienting their trade to Western Indian ports. Some chose an overland route, across the Western Ghats, for the export of spices. By the end of the 16th century, the Portuguese were finally able to deal with the "Mappila challenge". Kunjali Marakkar was defeated and killed, with the help of the Calicut ruler, in c. 1600 AD. The Ali Rajas of Cannanore was given permission to send ships to even to the Red Sea, as a way of ensuring their cooperation. The relentless battles led to the eventual decline of the Muslim community in Kerala, as they gradually lost control of the spice trade. The Muslims — who had been depended solely on commerce — were reduced into severe economic perplexity. Some traders turned inland (South Malabar) in search of alternate occupations to commerce. The Muslims of Kerala gradually became a society of small traders, landless labourers and poor fishermen. The once affluent, and urban, Muslim population became predominantly rural in Kerala.

The Tuhfat Ul Mujahideen written by Zainuddin Makhdoom II (born around 1532) of Ponnani during 16th-century CE is the first-ever known book fully based on the history of Kerala, written by a Keralite. It is written in Arabic and contains pieces of information about the resistance put up by the navy of Kunjali Marakkar alongside the Zamorin of Calicut from 1498 to 1583 against Portuguese attempts to colonize Malabar coast. It was first printed and published in Lisbon. A copy of this edition has been preserved in the library of Al-Azhar University, Cairo. Tuhfatul Mujahideen also describes the history of Mappila Muslim community of Kerala as well as the general condition of Malabar Coast in the 16th century CE.

The Kingdom of Mysore, ruled by Sultan Haider Ali, invaded and occupied northern Kerala in the late-18th century. In the following Mysore rule of Malabar, Muslims were favoured against the high caste Hindu landlords. Some were able to obtain some land rights and administrative positions. There was a sharp increase in community's growth, especially through conversions from the "outcaste" society. However, such measures of the Mysore rulers only widened the communal imbalance of Malabar. The East India Company — taking advantage of the situation — allied with the Hindu high castes to fight against the occupied regime. The British subsequently won the Anglo-Mysore War against Mysore ruler Tipu Sultan and, consequently, Malabar was organised as a district under Madras Presidency.

The discriminatory land tenure system — tracing its origins to pre modern Kerala — gave Muslims of Kerala (and other tenants and labourers) no access to land ownership. This led to a series of violent attacks against the high caste landlords and colonial administration (the Mappila Outbreaks, c. 1836–1921) and in 1921–22; it took in the form of an explosion known as Mappila Uprising (Malabar Rebellion). The uprising — which initially had the supported of Indian National Congress leaders such as Mohandas K. Gandhi- was suppressed by the colonial government, with martial law being temporarily instituted in the region and the leaders of the rebellion tried and executed.

Post-colonial era 
The Muslim material strength — along with the extent of modern education, theological "reform", and active participation in democratic process — recovered slowly after the 1921–22 Uprising. The Muslim numbers in provincial and central government posts remained staggeringly low. The Mappila literacy rate was only 5% in 1931. Even by 1947, only 3% of the taluk officers in Malabar region were Muslim.

The community was able to produce a number of high-regarded leaders in the following years. This included Mohammed Abdur Rahiman, and E. Moidu Moulavi of the Congress Party, and most crucially, the inspirational K. M. Seethi Sahib (1898–1960). Although the Muslim League faded into memory in the rest of India, it remained a serious political force in the state of Kerala with leaders such as Syed Abdurrahiman Bafaki Tangal, P. M. S. A. Pukkoya Tangal, and C. H. Mohammed Koya. K. O. Ayesha Bai, a member of Muslim community, the first Muslim women to rise to public fame in modern Kerala, became the Deputy Speaker of the Communist Kerala Assembly in 1957.

Active participation in the state elections gave rise to a psychology of accommodation that took the Muslims into cooperate relationships with Hindus and Christians of Kerala. The Communist-lead Kerala government granted the wish of the Muslim League for the formation of a Muslim majority district in 1969. University of Calicut, with the former Malabar District being its major catchment area, was established in 1968. Calicut International Airport, currently the twelfth busiest airport in India, was inaugurated in 1988. An Indian Institute of Management (IIM) was established at Kozhikode in 1996 and National Institute of Technology in 2002.

Modern Mappila theological revisions and social reforms were initiated by Wakkom Maulavi (1873–1932) in Kollam. The Maulavi was initially influenced by Muḥammad 'Abduh and Rashīd Riḍā, and to some degree by the ideas of Jamāl al-Dīn al-Afghānī and Muḥammad ibn 'Abd al-Wahhāb. He notably encouraged the Mappilas to adopt English education. Notable reformers such as K. M. Seethi Sahib (1898–1960), Khatib Muhammad K. M. Maulavi (1886–1964), E. K. Maulavi (1879–1974) and M. K. Haji carried his work forward to the modern age. K. M . Maulavi tried to spread the new ideas of southern Kerala to the more orthodox Malabar region. C. O. T. Kunyipakki Sahib, Maulavi Abussabah Ahmedali (died 1971), K. A. Jaleel, C. N. Ahmad Moulavi, and K. O. Ayesha Bai were other prominent social and political reformers of the 20th century. An organisation known as the Muslim Educational Society (MES), founded in 1964 by P. K. Abdul Ghafoor and friends, also played a role in the development of the community. Aikya Sangham (founded in 1922, Kodungallur) and Farook College (founded 1948) also promoted the higher education among the Muslims.

A large number of Muslims of Kerala found extensive employment in the Persian Gulf countries in the following years (beginning in the mid-1960s). This widespread participation in the Gulf Rush produced huge economic and social benefits for the community. Great influx funds from the earnings of Mappilas employed followed. Issues such as widespread poverty, unemployment and educational backwardness began to change. The Mappila community is now considered as section of Indian Muslims marked by recovery, change and positive involvement in the modern world. Mappila women are now not reluctant to join professional vocations and assuming leadership roles. As per the latest government data, female literacy rate in Malappuram District, center of Mappila distribution, stood at 91.55% (2011 Census). Lulu Group chairman M. A. Yusuf Ali, 19th richest man in India, is the richest Malayali, according to the Forbes magazine (2018). Azad Moopen, chairman of the Dubai-headquartered Aster DM Healthcare, is another major Muslim entrepreneur from Kerala. During his state visit to Saudi Arabia in 2016, Indian Prime Minister Narendra Modi presented the Saudi king Salman with a gold-plated replica of the Kodungallur Mosque.

Ever since in the Indian Independence from the British in 1947, the overwhelming majority of Muslims in former Malabar District have supported the Muslim League. In south Kerala, the community generally supported Indian National Congress and in the north Kerala a small proportion vote Communist Left. Politically, the Muslims in Kerala have exhibited more unanimity than any other major communities in modern Kerala.

Theological orientations/denominations 
Most of the Muslims of Kerala follow the traditional Shāfiʿī school of religious law (known in Kerala as the traditionalist Sunnis) while a large minority follow modern movements that developed within Sunni Islam. The latter section consists of majority Salafists (the Mujahids) and the minority Islamists.

The Sunnis referred here are identified by their conventional beliefs and practices and adherence to the Shāfiʿī madhhab, while the other theological orientations, of which the Salafi Mujahids constitute a large majority, are seen as modern "reform" movements within the Sunni Islam. Both the Sunnis and Mujahids again have been divided to a number of sub-identities.
 Sunnī Islam
Shāfi'ī— mainly two groups (majority of traditional Sunnis in Kerala are Shafiis).
Ḥanafī
Salafists (the Mujahids)—with different splinter factions (with varying degrees of puritanism). Kerala Nadvathul Mujahideen (K. N. M) is the largest Mujahid organisation in Kerala.
Islamists (the Jama'at-i-Islami India)—representing political Islam in Kerala.
 Shīiah Islam

Culture

Devotion and Festivals 
Because of the lack of ulema, before 1900 Islam among the majority of Mappilas, especially those converts from lower Hindu castes, was highly syncretic and was a mixture of Islamic and pre-Islamic practices, and today it retains many such practices. For instance, Mappilas often worshipped holy men (auliya) or matrys (shaheed) at their tombs (which should be distinguished from praying with the intercession of a vali). Still today it retains some of these practices. These saints were taken out in procession during festivals called nercha, which were organised along the lines of festivals for folk deities incorporating similar music and customs, such as the varavu (procession). In the later 20th century, many reformers considered these festivals to be 'un-Islamic' but they are still important parts of religious life for all communities in the region.

Mappila literature
Mappila Songs/Poems is a famous folklore tradition emerged in c. 16th century. The ballads are compiled in complex blend of Malayalam/Tamil and Arabic, Persian/Urdu in a modified Arabic script. Mappila songs have a distinct cultural identity, as they sound a mix of the ethos and culture of Dravidian South India as well as West Asia. They deal with themes such as romance, satire, religion, and politics. Moyinkutty Vaidyar (1875–91) is generally considered as the poet laureate of Mappila Songs.

As the modern Mappila literature developed after the 1921–22 Uprising, religious publications dominated the field.

Vaikom Muhammad Basheer (1910–1994), followed by, U. A. Khader, K. T. Muhammed, N. P. Muhammed and Moidu Padiyath are leading Mappila authors of the modern age. Mappila periodical literature and newspaper dailies — all in Malayalam — are also extensive and critically read among the Muslims. The newspaper known as "Chandrika", founded in 1934, played as significant role in the development of the Mappila community.

Mappila folk arts 
 Oppana was a popular form of social entertainment among the Muslims of Kerala. It is generally presented by women numbering about fifteen including musicians, as a part of wedding ceremonies a day before the wedding day. The bride, dressed in all finery, covered with gold ornaments, is the chief spectator; she sits on a peetham, around which the singing and dancing take place. While women sing, they clap their hands rhythmically and move around the bride in steps. Two or three girls begin the songs and the rest join the chorus.
 Kolkkali was a popular dance form among the Muslims of Kerala. It is played in group of 12 people with two sticks, similar to the Dandiya dance of Gujarat.
 Duff Muttu (also called Dubh Muttu) was an art form prevalent among Muslims of Kerala, using the traditional duff, or daf, also known as tappitta. Participants dance to the rhythm as they beat the duff.

Mappila Cuisine

The Mappila cuisine is a blend of traditional Kerala, Persian, Yemenese and Arab food culture. This confluence of culinary cultures is best seen in the preparation of most dishes. Kallummakkaya (mussels) curry, irachi puttu (irachi meaning meat), parottas (soft flatbread), Pathiri (a type of rice pancake) and ghee rice are some of the other specialties. The characteristic use of spices is the hallmark of Mappila cuisine—black pepper, cardamom and clove are used profusely.

The Malabar version of Mandi, popularly known as kuzhi mandi in Malayalam is another popular item, which has an influence from Yemen. Various varieties of biriyanis like Thalassery biriyani, Kannur biriyani, Kozhikode biriyani and Ponnani biriyani are prepared by the Mappila community.
 	
The snacks include unnakkaya (deep-fried, boiled ripe banana paste covering a mixture of cashew, raisins and sugar), pazham nirachathu (ripe banana filled with coconut grating, molasses or sugar), muttamala made of eggs, chatti pathiri, a dessert made of flour, like a baked, layered chapati with rich filling, arikkadukka, and more.

See also

Arabi Malayalam
Arabi Malayalam script
Beary Muslims
Beary language
Marakkars
Tamil Muslims
Sri Lankan Moors
Nasrani Mappila

References

Further reading
  (The English translation of the historic work Tuhfat Ul Mujahideen written about the society of Kerala by Zainuddin Makhdoom II during sixteenth century CE)

External links
BBC Hindi on Muslims in Kerala

Muslim communities of Kerala
 
Social groups of Kerala
Islam in Kerala